Fousek (feminine Fousková) is a Czech surname, denoting a bearded person. Notable people include:

 Adam Fousek, Czech footballer
 Petr Fousek, Czech footballer
 Vít Fousek Jr., Czech cross-country skier
 Vít Fousek Sr., Czech cross-country skier

Czech-language surnames